Cicero Township is one of six townships in Tipton County, Indiana, United States. As of the 2010 census, its population was 8,086 and it contained 3,646 housing units. It is the largest of the six townships in the county.

History
The Miami people were the first occupiers of Cicero Township. Upon early white settlement, the Miami resided on reservation land in what was then known as Hamilton County. On January 15, 1844, that reservation land became a part of Tipton County. The Miami were forced to leave the county, resulting in the Potawatomi Trail of Death. The majority of white settles in Cicero Township were from Southern Indiana, Ohio and Kentucky. Squatters were abundant in the area prior to land being available to purchase, which began in 1838. Settlement was sporadic in Cicero Township due to land that was "flat and low and would be difficult to drain," according to white settlers.

Geography

Natural landscape
Reports from the early 20th century state that despite being very flat and hard to drain, Cicero Township had lands with the finest agricultural potential "in the state." Historically, the area had plentiful oak, walnut, beech and ash trees, but most of the trees were cut for lumber in the late 19th century. Deer, squirrels, wild turkey, raccoons, mink, possum, and muskrats were plentiful during this time, too. Black bears were common near Cicero Creek. Gray wolves, cougars, and wild boars were hunted almost to extinction in the township's forests.

Cities and towns
 Tipton

Unincorporated towns
 Jackson at

Former settlements
 West Kinderhook
 Parrotsville

Adjacent townships
 Liberty Township (north)
 Wildcat Township (northeast)
 Madison Township (east)
 White River Township, Hamilton County (southeast)
 Jackson Township, Hamilton County (south)
 Jefferson Township (west)
 Prairie Township (northwest)

Economy

19th century
The first mill in the township was built by Samuel King. The mill handled both lumber and corn, using water from Cicero Creek for power. On a good day, King would process twelve bushels of corn. The second mill in the township was built by King and William Buffington. Also located on Cicero Creek, the mill was conveniently located at the Peru and Indianapolis Railroad Company stream crossing. The mill sawed timber and processed wheat and corn. Benjamin Bailey built a mill, which was horse powered, in 1850. Bailey allowed any farmer who wanted to grind their own corn to use the mill and horse. George Kane and Newton J. Jackson built a saw mill, which ran on steam, in 1851. The land where they built the steam saw mill is known as Jackson Station. Cicero Township's economy grew after the completion of the railroad to Peru, Indiana, which connected Peru to the Wabash and Erie Canal, in 1854. Another steam mill was built, by Thompson Innis, in 1854 at Parker's Mill (also called Parker's Corner).

Education

Early history

The first school was founded in West Kinderhook by Silas Blount in 1842. Early schools in the township were paid with private funds and teachers were paid based on student subscription. By 1914, public schools were operating in the township.

Today

Students who reside in Cicero Township attend schools that are a part of the Tipton Community School Corporation.

Government

Political districts
 Indiana's 5th congressional district
 State House District 32
 State House District 35
 State Senate District 20
 State Senate District 21

Infrastructure

Transportation

In 1844, Cicero Township was split into three transportation districts, each two miles wide. The initial roads were of poor quality and mainly corduroy roads. The roads suffered considerable damage during wet seasons and were prone to seeking given the damp and low geography of the township. By 1914,  railroads served the township and roads were made of gravel and macadam.

Major highways
  Indiana State Road 28

Airports and landing strips
 Tragesser Airport

Cemeteries
The township contains these eight cemeteries: Bethsaida, Fairview, Goar, Goodykoontz, Mauldentown, Sandbank, Stewart and Sumner.

References

Footnotes

Sources
 Pershing, Marvin W. "History of Tipton County, Indiana: Her People, Industries and Institutions". Indianapolis: B.F. Bowen (1914). 
 United States Census Bureau 2008 TIGER/Line Shapefiles
 United States Board on Geographic Names (GNIS)
 IndianaMap

External links
 Indiana Township Association
 United Township Association of Indiana

Townships in Tipton County, Indiana
Kokomo, Indiana metropolitan area
Townships in Indiana